Eilema gainsfordi is a moth of the subfamily Arctiinae. It was described by Lars Kühne in 2010. It is found in South Africa.

References

Endemic moths of South Africa
gainsfordi
Moths described in 2010